Plesiotrochidae is a family of sea snails, marine gastropod molluscs in the clade Sorbeoconcha. According to the taxonomy of the Gastropoda by Bouchet & Rocroi (2005) the family Plesiotrochidae has no subfamilies.

Genera 
Genera within the family Plesiotrochidae include:
 Plesiotrochus P. Fischer, 1878
 Trochocerithium Sacco, 1897
Genera brought into synonymy
 Hemicerithium Cossmann, 1893: synonym of Plesiotrochus Fischer, 1878
 Hypotrochus Cotton, 1932: synonym of Plesiotrochus Fischer, 1878

References 

 Houbrick R.S. 1990. Aspect of the anatomy of Plesiotrochus (Plesiotrochidae, fam. n.) and its systematic position in Cerithioidea (Prosobranchia Caenogastropoda). pp. 237–249, in: Wells F.E., Walker D.I., Kirkman H. & Letheridge R., eds., The marine fauna and flora of Albany. Volume 1. Perth, Western Australia Museum
 Healy J.M., 1993. Transfer of the gastropod family Plesiotrochidae to the Campaniloidea based on sperm ultrastructural evidence. Journal of Molluscan Studies 59, 135-146.